The Windglider was a sailing event on the Sailing at the 1984 Summer Olympics program in Long Beach, Los Angeles County, California . Seven races were scheduled. 38 sailors, on 38 boats, from 38 nations competed.

Results 

DNF = Did Not Finish, DNS= Did Not Start, DSQ = Disqualified, PMS = Premature Start, YMP = Yacht Materially Prejudiced 
 = Male,  = Female

Daily standings

Notes

References 
 
 
 
 

Windglider
Windglider